Gulval and Heamoor was an electoral division of Cornwall in the United Kingdom which returned one member to sit on Cornwall Council between 2009 and 2021. It was abolished at the 2021 local elections, being succeeded by Ludgvan, Madron, Gulval and Heamoor and Penzance East.

Councillors

Extent
Gulval and Heamoor represented the villages of Heamoor and Gulval and the hamlets of Trythogga, Chyandour and Trevarrack. The division was nominally abolished during boundary changes at the 2013 election, but this had little effect on the ward. Both before and after the boundary changes, the division covered 390 hectares in total.

Election results

2017 election

2013 election

2009 election

References

Penzance
Electoral divisions of Cornwall Council